Lipaphnaeus loxura is a butterfly in the family Lycaenidae. It is found in the Democratic Republic of the Congo (Uele, Kivu and Lualaba), Uganda, western Kenya, Tanzania and Zambia.

The larvae feed on Maesa species, including M. lanceolata and M. welwitschii.

References

Butterflies described in 1914
Aphnaeinae